Radslavice is a municipality and village in Vyškov District in the South Moravian Region of the Czech Republic. It has about 400 inhabitants.

Administrative parts
The village of Radslavičky is an administrative part of Radslavice.

References

Villages in Vyškov District